Zipline is an American company that designs, manufactures, and operates delivery drones. The company operates distribution centers in Rwanda, Ghana, Japan, the United States, and Nigeria, with signed agreements to begin service in Cote d'Ivoire and Kenya. As of April 2022, its drones have made over 20 million miles of flights across 275,000 commercial deliveries.

The company's drones deliver whole blood, platelets, frozen plasma, and cryoprecipitate along with medical products, including vaccines, infusions, and common medical commodities. As of September 2021, more than 75% of blood deliveries in Rwanda outside of Kigali use Zipline drones. In April 2019 in Ghana, the company began using drones to deliver vaccines, blood, and medicines. In addition, during the COVID-19 pandemic in 2020, the US Federal Aviation Administration (FAA) granted a Part 107 waiver to Zipline's partner organization Novant Health for the delivery of medical supplies and personal protective equipment (PPE) to medical facilities in North Carolina.

The company also offers delivery services for non-medical products as well, providing examples on its website for restaurants, groceries, convenience shopping and e-commerce.

History 

In 2011, Keller Rinaudo Cliffton founded Romotive, which produced an iPhone-controlled robotic toy called Romo. Co-founders Ryan Oksenhorn and William Hetzler joined during this era. In January 2014, the team decided to shut down Romotive to explore a more impactful mission. Keenan Wyrobek joined at this time to help find the new direction.

In March 2014, the company pivoted and began development of a medical drone delivery service.

In 2016, Zipline signed a deal with the Rwandan government to build a distribution center near Muhanga, and began commercial operations that same year. In 2018, the Rwandan government signed a new deal to build a second distribution center near Kayonza and expand Zipline's service to include smaller health centers in addition to hospitals and deliver vaccines and other medical products as well as blood products. 

In April 2018, Zipline announced a second-generation drone, which was listed in Time'''s "Best inventions of 2018" list. 

In April 2019, Zipline opened its first four planned distribution centers in Ghana to supply 2,500 health facilities. The fourth Ghanaian distribution center became operational in June 2020.

In May 2019, Zipline raised $190 million on a post-money valuation of $1.2 billion.In September 2019, musician Bono joined the board. According to Rinaudo: "Rural healthcare is a challenge in every country in the world, including in the United States ... You now see much bigger and wealthier countries like the US using Rwanda as a role model." Zipline was named to CNBC's 2018 (25th place), 2019 (39th place), 2020 (7th place), and 2022 (29th place) Disruptor 50 lists.

Along with nine other drone delivery companies, the FAA selected Zipline to participate in a type certification program for delivery drones in 2020.

In November 2020, Zipline started undergoing airworthiness certification with the FAA that would allow their "Sparrow" model of drone to fly in the U.S. The following February,  Zipline announced it was adding ultra-low temperature freezers to their distribution centers to allow them to deliver temperature-sensitive COVID-19 vaccines.

In May 2021, Bloomberg'' reported Zipline would be delivering vaccines to Cross River State and Northern Kaduna State in Nigeria. The following month, Zipline raised $250 million in new funding at a valuation of $2.75 billion.

In April 2022, the company announced that a partner, Toyota Tsusho, opened a center to do deliveries using Zipline equipment in Japan.

In June 2022, they announced a microphone-based collision avoidance system to detect and track nearby aircraft.

Operation

The company designs and manufactures its drones, and builds and operates its distribution centers, which also serve as a drone airport. Medical staff at remote hospitals and clinics place orders with Zipline, a fulfillment operator receives this order and prepares the medical products into a special delivery package with a parachute..

A Zipline flight operator then packs the medical products into a drone and performs pre-flight checks. The drone then flies itself to its delivery site while a remote pilot at each distribution center monitors all drones in flight. The drone descends to  before dropping the package under a paper parachute. A payload can land within a  diameter landing zone. The drone then returns to the distribution center and lands by its tail hook catching an arresting gear, similar to airplanes landing on an aircraft carrier. A Zipline distribution center can deliver medical supplies reliably anywhere within , even accounting for mountainous terrain and severe weather.

Drone specifications

Each distribution center is capable of making 500 deliveries per day.

The drones have a quickly-replaceable battery that allows rapid turnaround between flights. It has an inner carbon-fiber frame and an outer polystyrene shell. The drone is launched from a steel rail by an electric motor.

The drones have two propellers for redundancy and can fly safely on a single propeller or motor. A parachute that will bring the drone to the ground can be deployed if a larger set of faults occur. If the drone crashes, the outer components are frangible, breaking to release energy and impact the ground with less force.

Zipline's drones are capable of "level 4" autonomy: the ability to complete travel autonomously under normal environmental conditions without requiring pilot oversight.

Locations

Active Commercial Service

Rwanda 
Zipline operates two distribution centers in Rwanda. 

Zipline began deliveries at its first distribution center in Muhanga in late 2016. In 2018, the Rwandan government signed a new deal to build a second distribution center near Kayonza, in the eastern part of the country. This deal expanded Zipline's service to include smaller health centers and hospitals and deliver vaccines and other medical products and blood products. Zipline opened the Kayonza distribution center in December 2018. The company hoped this would bring coverage to 80% of the country.

Rwanda has mountainous geography and poor road conditions, making an aerial delivery system more efficient than the use of land vehicles. The cost of delivery via drone is comparable to that of delivery by road, especially in emergencies. A 2022 study found that Zipline's service in Rwanda leads to faster delivery times relative to existing ground transportation and less blood component wastage in health facilities. The study found that Zipline's drone delivery service in Rwanda shortened blood product delivery times by 61%, reduced blood unit expirations by 67%, and was frequently used in response to medical emergencies, with 43% of orders being emergency orders.

Ghana 
In 2018, Zipline signed a contract with the government of Ghana to make up to 600 deliveries a day for four years at the cost of about $12.5 million.  In April 2019, Ghana's president Nana Akufo-Addo announced the opening of the first distribution center in Ghana.  Vice President Mahamudu Bawumia launched the first Zipline drone to Tafo Hospital on April 24, 2019. This first delivery contained a resupply shipment of yellow fever vaccines to prevent stock-out. 

In 2021, the government of Ghana expanded its contract with Zipline to add four additional distribution centers, bringing the total number of contracted distribution centers in the country to eight. Zipline presently operates six distribution centers in Ghana, serving over 2,300 health facilities. When the network is complete, Zipline will be able to serve about 85% of the population directly and the remainder indirectly, reaching over 3,200 health facilities in every region of the country.

In March 2022, Zipline announced that the company had delivered over one million doses of the COVID-19 vaccine by drone in Ghana over the prior year. An independent study of Zipline's impact on the health system in Ghana found that Zipline's drone delivery service shortened vaccine stock-outs by 60%, decreased inventory-driven missed vaccination opportunities by 42%, decreased days facilities were without critical medical supplies by 21%, and increased the types of medicines and supplies stocked at health facilities by 10%.

United States 
As of 2018, Zipline was working with the FAA to develop rules for drone operation beyond the line of sight. 

During the COVID-19 pandemic in 2020, the FAA granted a Part 107 waiver to Novant Health in partnership with Zipline for the delivery of medical supplies and personal protective equipment to facilities in North Carolina. The company plans to offer deliveries to homes.

On November 18, 2021, Zipline started a trial service with Walmart for e-commerce shopping deliveries in Pea Ridge, Arkansas. The service, selectable to online shoppers using a special mobile app, could deliver to all residences within  of a particular Walmart store in Pea Ridge during daylight hours.

On June 21st, 2022 the license "Package Delivery by Drone (Part 135)" was granted.

On October 4th, 2022, Zipline began commercial delivery services in Salt Lake City, Utah, in partnership with Intermountain Healthcare.

Japan 
In April 2021, Zipline announced a partnership with an investor, Toyota Tsusho, to deliver medical products in Japan. While most Zipline facilities are staffed by locally hired operators employed by Zipline, the facilities in Japan are distinct in that they are operated by Sora-iina, a Toyota Tsusho Group company, and staffed by Toyota Tsusho employees. Zipline provides hardware and training in an OEM capacity. Construction of the first distribution center was completed in April 2022 on Fukue Island in the Gotō Islands. The drone delivery service will supply medical and pharmaceutical products to medical institutions and pharmacies in the Gotō Islands, which include 140 total islands (and five main localities). The use of drone delivery to assure routine distribution of medical products is expected to cut current sea and air transport options from several hours down to 30 minutes.

Nigeria 
In February 2021, Zipline announced a plan to construct three distribution centers in Kaduna State, Nigeria. These distribution centers would have ultra-cold storage that is capable of safely storing COVID-19 vaccines, for which health facilities in the state could then place on-demand orders without needing ultra-cold storage of their own. The state also intends to use Zipline's service to transport other health products, including blood, medication, and routine vaccines. In May 2021, Zipline announced a similar agreement with Cross River State. In February 2022, Zipline announced another agreement with Bayelsa State.

The first hub opened in Kaduna state in an undisclosed location on the 4th June 2022

Pending Service

Cote d'Ivoire 
In December 2021, the company announced an agreement to open four distribution centers in Cote d'Ivoire.

Kenya 
In February 2022, the company announced an agreement to build a distribution center in Kisumu County, Kenya.

Ukraine 
In June 2022 it was announced by the Ministry of Health of Ukraine that talks were ongoing to partner with Zipline to build ten Zipline distribution hubs in Ukraine.

Demonstration Operations

Australia 
Between July 30 and September 5, 2019, Zipline partnered with the US and Australian militaries, delivering over 400 mock blood supplies during mass casualty simulations.

Weblinks 

 Website

References 

Logistics companies of the United States
Emerging technologies
American companies established in 2011
Transport companies established in 2011
2011 establishments in California
Medical technology companies of the United States
Unmanned aerial vehicles
Companies based in South San Francisco, California